Sivaladapidae is an extinct family of adapiform primates from Asia.  They survived longer than any other adapiform primate because they were able to shift south as the climate cooled.  Their remains date from the Eocene through the Miocene.

Classification
Family Sivaladapidae
Subfamily Sivaladapinae
Subfamily Hoanghoniinae
Subfamily Anthradapinae
Genus Anthradapis
incertae sedis
Genus Guangxilemur
Genus Kyitchaungia
Genus Laomaki
Genus Paukkaungia
Genus Ramadapis
Genus Siamoadapis
Genus Yunnanodapis

References

Prehistoric strepsirrhines
Eocene first appearances
Miocene extinctions
Primate families
Prehistoric mammal families